OHCA may refer to:
Oklahoma Health Care Authority
Out-of-hospital cardiac arrest